The Prime Minister's Laptop Scheme (or Prime Minister's National Laptop Scheme) was an initiative undertaken by then Prime Minister of Pakistan Mian Muhammad Nawaz Sharif as a part of the Prime Minister’s Youth Programme. The program aimed at provision of laptops to deserving students studying in public and semi-public universities throughout Pakistan. The Government of Pakistan Tehreek-e-Insaf abolished this scheme along with many others.

Date of Initiation 

The scheme was formally initiated on May 23, 2014, with the aim to award students attaining higher marks in public and semi-public universities with free laptops under the program.

Phase I 

Phase I of the scheme was based on the marks(or grades) obtained during(or cumulative up to) the academic year 2013-14.

Phase II 

Phase II of the scheme was based on the marks 448 (or grades) C obtained during(or cumulative up to) the academic year 2014-2015. The laptops distributed during Phase II were detachable with free Evo connectivity and sim enabled.

Phase III 

Phase III of the scheme is complete.

Phase IV 
Prime Minister’s Laptop Scheme Phase 4 & 5 are completed.

References

Education in Pakistan
Nawaz Sharif administration